Pempelia heringii, the  pear fruit borer, is a moth of the family Pyralidae found in Japan and China and also reported from Hawaii. Two generations occur per year. Larvae have been reported feeding on apple, pear, and Chinese hawthorn. They feed inside young fruit and eject frass from the entry hole, causing visible damage.

References

External links
Final import risk analysis report for fresh apple fruit from the People’s Republic of China

Moths described in 1888
Phycitini
Taxa named by Émile Louis Ragonot